Corrado Olmi (24 October 1926 – 29 December 2020) was an Italian actor and comedian.

Life and career 
Born in Jesi, Ancona, Olmi at very young age attended local amateur dramatic companies in his hometown. He later moved to Rome, where he graduated in law and during his studies attended the Peter Sharoff Theatre Academy. He was a very prolific stage actor, with hundreds of credits in works of prose, avanspettacolo, cabaret, operetta. He was also very active in television (in television movies, TV-series and variety shows) and in films, where he was one of the most requested character actors.  Olmi is also the author of two autobiographical books, Oltre la scena and Oltre lo schermo.

He died from COVID-19 during the COVID-19 pandemic in Italy.

Selected filmography

Peccato di castità (1956)
Chiamate 22-22 tenente Sheridan (1960) – Pat – journalist
Un mandarino per Teo (1960) – Il signore in bianco
A Girl... and a Million (1962) – Visonà's Friend
L'amore difficile (1962) – Carabiniere (segment "Il serpente")
Adultero lui, adultera lei (1963) – L'avvocato dell'accusa
Shivers in Summer (1964) – Furricchio
I maniaci (1964) – The husband (segment "Il week-end")
Clémentine chérie (1964)
I due pericoli pubblici (1964) – Vigile (segment "Una domenica d'agosto")
Slalom (1965) – Italian Embassy Official
Wake Up and Die (1966) – Bobino, riccetatore
I nostri mariti (1966) – Monsignor Petrarca (segment "Il marito di Olga")
Sex Quartet (1966) – Aldini's Friend (segment "Fata Armenia")
The Devil in Love (1966) – Innkeeper
A Stranger in Paso Bravo (1968) – Jonathan
The Vatican Affair (1968) – Lentini
Ace High (1968)
Bandits in Rome (1968)
Colpo di sole (1968)
Satyricon (1969) – Seleuco
12 + 1 (1969) – Waiter (uncredited)
The Archangel (1969) – Commissario Monteforte
The Cat o' Nine Tails (1971) – Morsella
Joe Dakota (1957)
Armiamoci e partite! (1971) – German soldier
Il merlo maschio (1971) – Violin teacher
Four Flies on Grey Velvet (1971) – Porter
A Girl in Australia (1971) – Don Anselmo
Il provinciale (1971)
Decameroticus (1972) – Ciacco
My Darling Slave (1973) – A passenger
Anno uno (1974) – Di Vittorio
Professore venga accompagnato dai suoi genitori (1974) – Mr. Novelli
L'uomo della strada fa giustizia (1975) – (uncredited)
Scandal in the Family (1975)  – don Erminio
Apache Woman (1976) – Jeremy
The Cricket (1980)
Madly in Love (1981) – Sindaco
Bollenti spiriti (1981) – Doctor
 (1981) – Agente di viaggi
Porca vacca (1982)
Rich and Poor (1983) – S.O.F.R.A.M. Manager
Il petomane (1983)
Sfrattato cerca casa equo canone (1983) – Commissario
Due strani papà (1984)
Bonnie and Clyde Italian Style (1984) – Bonetti – negoziante di giocattoli
Il ragazzo del Pony Express (1986) – Father of Agostino
Missione eroica – I pompieri 2 (1987)
Il coraggio di parlare (1987) – Milan worker
Rimini Rimini – Un anno dopo (1988) – Flaminia's Husband ("La scelta")
Don Bosco (1988)
Italian Restaurant (1994, TV Mini-Series)
The Dinner (1998) – Arturo
Si fa presto a dire amore (2000) – Padre Enrico

References

External links 

1926 births
2020 deaths
People from Iesi
20th-century Italian male actors
Italian male stage actors
Nastro d'Argento winners
Italian male film actors
Italian comedians
Italian male television actors
Deaths from the COVID-19 pandemic in Lazio